Cereopsius obliquemaculatus is a species of beetle in the family Cerambycidae. It was described by Karl-Ernst Hüdepohl in 1989. It is known from Borneo.

References

Cereopsius
Beetles described in 1989